A by-election was held for the Victorian Legislative Assembly seat of Melbourne on Saturday 21 July 2012. This was triggered by the resignation of former minister and state Labor MLA Bronwyn Pike which she announced on 7 May 2012.

Sixteen candidates contested the by-election, the Liberals declined to nominate a candidate. Jennifer Kanis retained the seat for Labor with a 51.5 per cent (–4.7) two-candidate-preferred vote against Greens candidate Cathy Oke.

Dates

Background
The federal seat of Melbourne held by Labor was won by the Greens at the August 2010 federal election, where the Liberals preferenced the Greens ahead of Labor. At the November 2010 Victorian state election where the Liberals preferenced Labor ahead of the Greens, the Liberal/National Coalition won 45 seats and Labor won 43 seats in the 88-seat Legislative Assembly, resulting in a one-seat majority for the incoming Coalition government. Labor retained the state seat of Melbourne on a 56.2 per cent two-candidate-preferred vote against the Greens and a 64.4 per cent two-party-preferred vote against the Liberals. On the primary vote, Labor won 35.7 per cent, the Greens won 31.9 per cent, the Liberals won 28.0 per cent, and four other candidates won a combined 4.4 per cent. With the Liberals declining to field a candidate, there was an increased chance of the seat changing hands due to changed preference flows, such as at the 2002 Cunningham by-election (Federal) and the 2009 Fremantle by-election (WA State).

Due to the voting patterns to the Greens across jurisdictions, this state by-election, unusually received national attention.

Candidates
The 16 candidates in ballot paper order were as follows:

Polling
From 7 to 10 June 2012, 365 voters (5% MoE) in the seat were telephone polled by Roy Morgan Research. The Greens' two-candidate-preferred vote was at 54 per cent to 46 per cent for Labor. The Greens' primary vote was at 48.5 per cent, Labor on 37.5 per cent, and Mayne on 7 per cent, with "others including Gary Morgan and Kevin Chamberlain" on a collective 7 per cent. Morgan and Chamberlain did not nominate.
On 16 July 2012, 403 voters (5% MoE) in the seat were robocall polled by ReachTel with results published in The Australian. The Greens' primary vote was at 38.1 per cent, Labor on 36.5 per cent, the Sex Party on 6.1 per cent, Mayne on 4.3 per cent, Family First on 3.8 per cent, with the remaining 11 candidates on a collective 11.2 per cent. While no two-candidate vote was produced, preference flows were said to be evenly divided between Labor and the Greens.

Preferences
How-to-vote cards (HTVs) had six candidates recommending voters to preference Labor over the Greens: Ahmed, Family First, Nolte, the DLP, the Sex Party, and the Christians. Six candidates recommended voters preference the Greens over Labor: Perkins, Collyer, Toscano, Mayne, Borland, and Whitehead. Not recommending preferences were Schorel-Hlavka and O'Connor.

Results

Almost two-thirds of preferences went to Labor over the Greens. The two-candidate vote remained level during the polling booth count, however the postal vote count favoured Labor and put the result beyond doubt. The Greens conceded defeat on 24 July. The Victorian Electoral Commission (VEC) officially declared that Labor had retained the seat on 25 July. Results were final as of 31 July.

External links
2012 Melbourne by-election distribution of preference votes: VEC 
2012 Melbourne by-election HTV cards, 35 registered HTVs: VEC
2012 Melbourne by-election website: VEC
@electionsvic VEC account: Twitter
2012 Melbourne by-election: Antony Green ABC
Poll Bludger pre-election - post-election

See also
Electoral results for the district of Melbourne
List of Victorian state by-elections

References

2012 elections in Australia
Victorian state by-elections
2010s in Melbourne